Aethalopteryx diksami is a moth in the family Cossidae. It is found in Socotra, Yemen, where it is only known from the central part of Socotra Island from two valleys: the Diksam canyon and the Difarroha valley, which are characterized by the following relict woody vegetation: Dracaena cinnabari, Buxus hildebrandtii, Croton socotranus and numerous other endemic plants.

References

Moths described in 2010
Aethalopteryx
Endemic fauna of Socotra